Houjiatang station is a subway station in Tianxin District, Changsha, Hunan, China, operated by the Changsha subway operator Changsha Metro. It entered revenue service on June 28, 2016.

History 
The station opened on 28 June 2016.

Layout

Surrounding area
He Long Stadium
Baisha Well
Changsha No. 15 School
 Entrance No.3: Tian Han Grand Theatre

References

Railway stations in Hunan
Railway stations in China opened in 2016